Daniel James Schneider (born January 14, 1966) is an American television producer, screenwriter, and actor. After appearing in mostly supporting roles in a number of 1980s and 1990s films and TV shows, Schneider devoted himself to behind-the-scenes work in production. He is the co-president of television production company Schneider's Bakery and made  What I Like About You for The WB and All That, The Amanda Show, Drake & Josh, Zoey 101, iCarly, Victorious, Sam & Cat, Henry Danger, Game Shakers, and The Adventures of Kid Danger for Nickelodeon. In March 2018, Nickelodeon announced that they had parted ways with Schneider. He was later accused of misconduct by some of his former employees, which he has partly denied.§

In a 2021 interview with The New York Times, Schneider announced that he had written and sold a new pilot to a different network.

Early life

Schneider was born and raised in Memphis, Tennessee, to Harry and Carol Schneider. He attended Harvard University for one semester. Upon returning to Memphis, he found work repairing computers. Soon after, he moved to Los Angeles to pursue a career in the entertainment industry.

Career

Acting career
In the 1980s, Schneider appeared in several films including Making the Grade, Better Off Dead, The Big Picture, Happy Together and Hot Resort.

In 1986, Schneider played Dennis Blunden on the ABC television sitcom Head of the Class. The series ran for five seasons from 1986 to 1991. In 1993, Schneider starred in the series Home Free, and in 1994, he played Shawn Eckhardt in Tonya & Nancy: The Inside Story, one of two made-for-television films about the Tonya Harding–Nancy Kerrigan scandal.

Schneider has made cameo appearances in TV series that he has helped to create/produce: In All That (and its subsequent film Good Burger), Kenan & Kel, The Amanda Show, Zoey 101, iCarly, and Henry Danger. Schneider also does voice overs in many projects.

Writing and producing career

Television series (1988–present)
In 1988, Schneider co-hosted the second annual Nickelodeon Kids' Choice Awards, where he met Albie Hecht, a development executive for Nickelodeon. In 1993, Hecht, now head of production for the network, hired Schneider to work on a new sketch-comedy show for children called All That. After writing the pilot episode, Schneider worked as producer, executive producer, and writer on the show. Schneider quit All That after the first four seasons to run The Amanda Show. The show's ratings soon declined, and it was cancelled in the 2000–2001 season. Nickelodeon then asked Schneider to come back and revamp All That in 2001. Schneider agreed, and All That returned to Nickelodeon in 2002. It ran for another four seasons until 2005, bringing All That to the end of its 10-season run.

From 1996 to 1997, Schneider was an executive producer and a writer for Kenan & Kel. Schneider guest-starred in an episode and was an executive producer during the first two seasons. He continued working as a consultant for the remainder of the series. In 1998, Schneider began his career as a show creator with Guys Like Us. The series is one of only two series Schneider created that was produced for broadcast network television. The show was cancelled after its first season due to low ratings and poor reviews.

The next two shows created by Schneider starred Amanda Bynes, who had worked with Schneider on All That. The Amanda Show ran from 1999 until 2002 on Nickelodeon and was a spin-off from All That. Schneider himself often appeared on The Amanda Show as a frustrated old man who was frequently the victim of strange prank phone calls. Schneider co-created What I Like About You with former Friends writer/producer Wil Calhoun. It premiered in 2002 on The WB and ran until 2006. Schneider was an executive producer during the show's first two seasons.

Schneider returned to Nickelodeon in 2004 with the show Drake & Josh. The series starred Drake Bell and Josh Peck, who were actors on The Amanda Show, and Miranda Cosgrove, who would later star in another of Schneider's shows, iCarly. Overlapping both Drake & Josh and iCarly, Schneider created the show Zoey 101, which starred Jamie Lynn Spears. Zoey 101 was Schneider's first and to date only single-camera format program and the first to be presented in a letterboxed format. Schneider also guest-starred in the Zoey 101 series finale "Chasing Zoey", playing a cab driver. After the show was cancelled in 2008, Schneider began working on a new project for one of the actresses, Victoria Justice. That show, Victorious, premiered in 2010 after the 2010 Kids' Choice Awards. A dual-show spin-off of both iCarly and Victorious called Sam & Cat premiered in 2013. It was cancelled after 36 episodes. On March 9, 2010, it was announced that Schneider himself would sign a deal with Nickelodeon.

Following the cancellation of Sam & Cat, Schneider co-created Henry Danger with Dana Olsen. The show premiered in 2014. The following year, Schneider created Game Shakers, which reunited him with actor and Nickelodeon veteran  Kel Mitchell. Schneider also serves as executive producer.

Jacques Steinberg of The New York Times said that Schneider "has become the Norman Lear of children's television".

Exit from Nickelodeon (2018)

On March 26, 2018, Nickelodeon announced that it would not be extending its production deal with Schneider and Schneider's Bakery. In addition, the network also announced that Schneider's comedy Game Shakers would not be renewed for a fourth season. Schneider's remaining Nickelodeon comedy Henry Danger would be receiving a fifth season and a new showrunner. Deadline Hollywood, the first to report about Nickelodeon parting ways with Schneider, also reported that there were complaints about Schneider's alleged behavior, including his alleged "well-documented temper issues for years" and his tweets showing photos of his young actresses' feet. Nickelodeon did not respond to Deadlines report and Schneider's representative refused to comment on the report.

In 2021, the New York Times reported that Nickelodeon's decision to sever ties with Schneider came after ViacomCBS, its parent company, completed an internal investigation that found evidence of verbal abuse by Schneider to his colleagues. Some of Schneider's colleagues told the Times that they found him to be difficult to work with and "prone to tantrums and angry emails". The investigation did not find evidence of sexual misconduct. When asked about the allegations, Schneider defended his work and said that if people found him to be hard to work with, it was because he maintained "high standards" as showrunner. In August 2022, Insider reported several new allegations from former actors and employees, including accusations of gender discrimination and "ask[ing] for massages from adult female colleagues". A person "close to Schneider" said Schneider "regrets ever asking anyone [for a massage] and agrees it was not appropriate". Russell Hicks, a former executive at Nickelodeon, denied allegations of "sexualized" scenes in the shows, claiming that "parents and caregivers and their friends [were] watching every single frame of footage and listening to every joke", and that "Every single thing that Dan ever did on any of his shows was carefully scrutinized and approved".

Pilot projects (2021) 
After a "three-year hiatus," Schneider announced that he had several new projects in development; The New York Times commented that he seemed "set on returning to television and reintroducing his brand of comedy to new audiences." In a June 2021 interview, Schneider described an "ambitious and very different" television pilot that he had written and sold to a different network. Schneider said that this proposed show is aimed at more of an adult audience than his previous work.

Films
Schneider has also been involved in films. He wrote the film Good Burger, which starred Kenan Thompson and Kel Mitchell (and featured Schneider himself in a supporting role as Mr. Baily, the owner and manager of Good Burger).  Good Burger was spun off from a popular comedy sketch which Schneider produced on his Nickelodeon television show All That.

Schneider also wrote and co-produced the film Big Fat Liar which starred Frankie Muniz, Amanda Bynes and Paul Giamatti. The film earned a worldwide total of $52,461,017 at the box office.

Personal life
Schneider married food blogger Lisa Lillien in 2002. The two met at Nickelodeon in the 1990s. In 2016, Schneider and his wife purchased a $9 million mansion in Hidden Hills, California from heiress Lori Milgard.

Filmography

Awards and nominations

References

External links
 
 

1966 births
Film producers from Tennessee
American male film actors
American male screenwriters
American male television actors
American television producers
American television writers
Harvard University alumni
Living people
Male actors from Memphis, Tennessee
American male television writers
Songwriters from Tennessee
Nickelodeon people
Nickelodeon Animation Studio people
Showrunners
Television show creators
20th-century American screenwriters
20th-century American male writers
21st-century American screenwriters
21st-century American male writers